Original New York Seltzer is a carbonated soft drink. It was produced from about 1981 until 1994 by father and son Alan and Randy Miller as a non-caffeinated line of sodas featuring natural flavors with no preservatives or artificial colors. The brand was revived in mid-2015, featuring eight flavors: Root Beer, Vanilla Cream, Raspberry, Peach, Lemon & Lime, BlueBerry, Black Cherry, and Concord Grape. Cola & Berry was added in 2016. The original Original New York Seltzer flavors also included Orange and Strawberry, in addition to all of the above (with the exception of Concord Grape).

In 2017, Original New York Seltzer expanded into creating a new line of eight flavors of sparkling water, which include Grapefruit, Lime, Original, Orange, Watermelon, Lemon, Coconut and 6 Berry.

References

External links
 ONYS- Official Website
 Bevnet Reviews

Carbonated drinks
American soft drinks